Arsin Arena is an indoor volleyball venue located in Arsin town of Trabzon Province, Turkey. Built in 2010, the arena has a capacity of 500 spectators.

Volleyball matches for girls were played at this arena during the 2011 European Youth Summer Olympic Festival.

References

Sports venues in Trabzon
Sports venues completed in 2010
Volleyball venues in Turkey